Thomas Read Kemp (23 December 1782 – 20 December 1844) was an English property developer and politician.

Life
He was the son of Sussex landowner and Member of Parliament Thomas Kemp, and his wife Anne, daughter of Henry Read of Brookland. He was educated at Westminster School, and matriculated at St John's College, Cambridge in 1801. He graduated B.A. 1805, M.A. 1810. He entered the Middle Temple in 1804.

Kemp lived at Herstmonceaux, then conceived and developed the Regency-style Kemp Town estate in Brighton on the south coast of England. He was Member of Parliament for Lewes 1811–16 and 1826–37 and for Arundel 1823–26. 

He fled Britain in 1837 to escape his creditors and died in Paris in 1844. He is buried in Père Lachaise Cemetery. A tablet was erected to his memory at St Nicholas's Church.

Family

Kemp married Frances Baring, daughter of Sir Francis Baring, 1st Baronet and Harriet Herring in 1806. They had four sons and six daughters. She died during childbirth in 1825 and was buried at St. Nicholas's Church.

As second marriage in 1832, Kemp wedded Frances Shakerley of Somerford, widow of Harvey Vigors. They had one son.

References
Rose Collis (2010) The New Encyclopedia of Brighton Brighton and Hove City Council

Notes

External links 
 
 Thomas Read Kemp

1780s births
1844 deaths
Members of the Parliament of the United Kingdom for English constituencies
Burials at Père Lachaise Cemetery
History of Brighton and Hove
UK MPs 1807–1812
UK MPs 1812–1818
UK MPs 1826–1830
UK MPs 1830–1831
UK MPs 1831–1832
UK MPs 1832–1835
UK MPs 1835–1837
Alumni of St John's College, Cambridge
British politicians who committed suicide
People from Herstmonceux
 Suicides in France
1840s suicides